Sholoqun (also Romanized as Sholoqūn; also known as Sholoqūn-e Vīznah, Sholoqūn-e Vīztah, and Shūlūqūn) is a village in Chubar Rural District, Haviq District, Talesh County, Gilan Province, Iran. At the 2006 census, its population was 845, in 192 families.

References 

Populated places in Talesh County